The Florentine is a 1999 film directed by Nick Stagliano and produced by Francis Ford Coppola's American Zoetrope. It stars Jeremy Davies,Michael Madsen, and Chris Penn.

The film was shot in the Lehigh Valley in Pennsylvania in the cities of Allentown, Bethlehem, Easton, and in the Lehigh Valley borough of Hellertown.

Cast
Jeremy Davies as Truby
Michael Madsen as "Whitey"
Chris Penn as Bobby
Luke Perry as Frankie
Tom Sizemore as Teddy Finn
Virginia Madsen as Molly
Mary Stuart Masterson as Vikki
Hal Holbrook as "Smitty"
Burt Young as Joe McCollough
James Belushi as Billy Belasco
Lillo Brancato as "Pretty"
Jill Hennessy as Brenda
Maeve Quinlan as Claire

Reception

References

External links

1999 drama films
American drama films
American Zoetrope films
Films produced by Francis Ford Coppola
Films scored by Marco Beltrami
Films set in Pennsylvania
Films shot in Allentown, Pennsylvania
1990s English-language films
1990s American films